Adam Myerson (born May 9, 1972) is an American professional  bicycle racer specializing in cyclo-cross and criterium racing.  

Adam is an active race promoter, series organizer, and coach; was the first American on the Union Cycliste Internationale Cyclo-cross commission (until 2009) as well as the AIOC-Cross Management Committee; and was the USA Cycling Collegiate National Cyclocross Champion in 1997. Myerson lives in Dorchester, Massachusetts, USA.

Myerson has been a vegetarian since 1989, primarily for animal rights reasons. He was also a strict vegan from the early 2000s to 2006. Myerson has published several articles on being a meat-free endurance athlete. He is an outspoken anti-doping advocate as well.

He is the owner and head coach of Cycle-Smart, Inc.

Major results

Cyclo-cross

1997
 1st  National Collegiate Championships
2003–2004
 2nd Michael R. Rabe Midwest Cyclo-Cross 
2008–2009
 3rd NBX Grand Prix of Cross Day 1
2009–2010
 2nd Nittany Lion Cross
 2nd NBX Grand Prix of Cross Day 1
 3rd NBX Grand Prix of Cross Day 2
 3rd HPCX
 3rd Charm City Cross
2010–2011
 1st Verge New England Championship Cyclocross Series
 1st Downeast Cyclocross Day 2
 1st NBX Grand Prix of Cross Day 1
 2nd NBX Grand Prix of Cross Day 2
 2nd The Cycle-Smart International Day 2
 2nd Nittany Lion Cross
 2nd HPCX
 3rd Baystate Cyclo-cross Day 1
 3rd Baystate Cyclo-cross Day 2
2011–2012
 3rd National Masters 40-45 Championships
 3rd Kingsport Cyclo-cross Cup
2013–2014
 3rd Kingsport Cyclo-cross Cup
2016–2017
 1st  National Masters 45-49 Championships
2017–2018
 1st  National Masters 45-49 Championships
2018–2019
 1st  Pan American Masters 45-54 Championships
 1st  National Masters 45-49 Championships
2021–2022
 1st  Pan American Masters 50-54 Championships

Road

2003
 1st Stage 8 FBD Milk Rás
2007
 3rd 
 4th Overall USA Crits
2008
 2nd Overall USA Crits
2009
 3rd Overall USA CRITS
 5th Criterium, National Road Championships
2015
 1st Stage 8 Tour of America's Dairyland
 2nd Tour of Somerville
2017
 1st  Road race, National Masters 45-49 Championships
 3rd Clarendon Cup
2018
 1st  Criterium, National Masters 45-49 Championships

References

External links 

 
 Interview: Adam Myerson - man of many hats (part 2) from Podium Insight

American male cyclists
Cyclo-cross cyclists
Living people
1972 births
People from Norwood, Massachusetts
People from Dorchester, Massachusetts